Guy Hoffman (born May 20, 1954 in Milwaukee, Wisconsin) is a drummer and vocalist, formerly of such bands as Oil Tasters, BoDeans, Violent Femmes and Absinthe. He is a composer for such films as Field Day and a founding member of Radio Romeo.

Life
Hoffman began playing drums at the age of nine. He developed skills in music and art under the direction of Eddie Allen, Sylvia Spicuzza, LeRoy Augustine, and Joe Ferrara within the Shorewood public school system. From 1972 to 1976, Hoffman concentrated on watercolor painting and drawing under professor Laurence Rathsack in the University of Wisconsin–Milwaukee (UWM) Fine Arts programs. He also played popular music with local bands at live music venues throughout Wisconsin. From 1977 to 1978, Hoffman studied graphic arts with Leon Travanti and graduated from UWM with a BA in fine art and visual communications.

Music career
Hoffman was a founding member of The Haskels and Oil Tasters, bands in Milwaukee's punk scene. He was an original member of Milwaukee roots rock band, BoDeans. He performs on the BoDeans 1986 debut album "Love & Hope & Sex & Dreams" (reissued in 2009 as a CD/DVD set). Hoffman performs in BoDeans videos for the songs "She's A Runaway" and "Fadeaway." He reunited with BoDeans singer/songwriter Sam Llanas to form the band Absinthe and released A Good Day To Die in 1998.

Hoffman joined Violent Femmes in 1993. Two versions of "Blister In The Sun," the Femmes' signature song, were recorded with Hoffman for  Grosse Pointe Blank motion picture soundtrack in 1997. Hoffman appears with Violent Femmes in film concerts and television productions such as "Woodstock '94," "Sabrina, the Teenage Witch," "VH-1 Hard Rock Live," and others. He appeared on numerous music videos and late-night talk shows in the United States, Canada, Europe and Australia. In 2005, Hoffman's contributions were included on two Violent Femmes reissued CD/DVD compilations. Hoffman also designed the cover for the album New Times by Violent Femmes.

Hoffman plays drums on the CD Jeanne Spicuzza. The track "Let the Mermaids Flirt With Me" appears in the movie Field Day.

In 2002, he was replaced in the Femmes by returning original drummer Victor DeLorenzo. He continued working with other projects and in 2006, he played a few select shows with the Violent Femmes once more.

In 2005, Hoffman formed Radio Romeo, a Los Angeles-based rock band.
	
In 2006, he returned to performing shows with Violent Femmes in Southern California. Their latest CD, Archive Series No. 2: Live in Chicago Q101, showcases the trio's unique acoustic approach, with Hoffman on snare drum and backing vocals.

Discography
The Haskels (1979/2019) LP/CD
Oil Tasters (1982/2005) LP/CD
Love & Hope & Sex & Dreams (1986)
New Times (1994)
Woodstock '94 (1994) CD and VHS
Rock!!!!! (1995)
Grosse Pointe Blank: Music from the Film (1997)
The Great Lost Brew Wave Album (1997)
A Good Day To Die (1998)
Viva Wisconsin (1999)
Freak Magnet (2000)
History in 3 Chords (2001)
Something's Wrong (2001)
Jeanne Spicuzza (2001)
Permanent Record: The Very Best of Violent Femmes (2005)
Permanent Record - Live & Otherwise (2005) DVD
Archive Series No. 2: Live in Chicago Q101 (2006)
Radio Romeo (2007)
Love & Hope & Sex & Dreams Collector's Edition (2009) CD/DVD Set

References

External links

Guy Hoffman's homepage
Field Day

American rock drummers
University of Wisconsin–Milwaukee alumni
Musicians from Milwaukee
Living people
1954 births
Violent Femmes members
20th-century American drummers
American male drummers
BoDeans members